The Faculty is an American sitcom starring Meredith Baxter as a middle school administrator. The show aired on ABC from March to June 1996.

Premise
Baxter played Flynn Sullivan, a divorced vice-principal balancing the demands of her career with single motherhood. The Faculty was notable among school-based programs for its focus on activity in Hamilton Middle School's faculty lounge, rather than in the classrooms. Co-creator Neil Thompson called it "an adult-based show," and said that the relationships among the school's staff were the central element.

The premiere episode featured Sullivan's decision whether to expel a student for painting graffiti on a school wall that accused a teacher of having sex with a sheep.

Cast
 Meredith Baxter as Flynn Sullivan, school vice principal
 Jenica Bergere as Amanda Duvall, new math teacher
 Peter Michael Goetz as Herb Adams, school principal
 Nancy Lenehan as Daisy Skelnick, Herb's secretary
 Peter MacKenzie as Clark Edwards, a history teacher
 Miguel A. Núñez, Jr. as Luis Jackson, a school nurse
 Constance Shulman as Shelly Ray, Flynn's best friend and the school's most cynical teacher

Episodes

Background and production
Baxter said that the role of Flynn Sullivan appealed to her because it was a break with TV tradition, portraying an "intelligent, capable woman" who "isn't looked at a sexual object or as a target" and "doesn't need to be defended and protected and rescued." The Seattle Post-Intelligencer described Flynn as "90 percent dignity, 10 percent dizziness." Baxter said she "would love to go with less dignity" but compared the character to Mary Richards: "everyone around her can be a little nuts, but there has to be some center there that viewers can believe in."

In creating the show, Baxter knew she wanted to set it in a workplace as opposed to a family home, in contrast with her previous work (such as the hit 1980s sitcom Family Ties). She and her colleagues considered settings including a fashion magazine, an advertising agency and a newspaper before deciding on a school.

Baxter was also one of the show's executive producers, along with Thompson, whose parents and sister were teachers, and Gary Murphy.

Response
The Faculty premiered on Wednesday, March 13, 1996 as a midseason replacement.

Reviews of the show were generally unfavorable. Matt Roush of USA Today said The Faculty "fails the critical tests of originality and pungency," although he called Baxter the show's "one unmistakable asset." Howard Rosenberg of the Los Angeles Times said the sitcom was "of light merit," comparing its characters unfavorably to the funnier school personalities of The Simpsons. Frederic Biddle of The Boston Globe was particularly negative, calling Baxter a failure as a physical comedian and decrying "the stick-figure boobies who pass for supporting characters."

In contrast, The San Diego Union-Tribunes John Freeman praised the show, calling its ensemble cast "notably strong" and naming Shulman and Goetz as stand-outs.<ref name="Freeman">Freeman, John. "Baxter, cast have distinct faculty for sitcom humor". The San Diego Union-Tribune, 1996-03-13, p. E7.</ref>The Faculty'' won its time slot with its premiere episode, placing 34th in the weekly Nielsen ratings.

References

External links

1990s American school television series
1990s American sitcoms
1996 American television series debuts
1996 American television series endings
American Broadcasting Company original programming
English-language television shows
Middle school television series